Sir Graham Hugh Boyce  (born 6 October 1945) is a British retired diplomat. He is the son of Commander Hugh Boyce and brother to Philip Boyce, who was president of the Royal College of Psychiatry in Australia, and Lord Boyce, former First Sea Lord of the Royal Navy and Chief of the Defence Staff.

Career
Boyce was educated at Hurstpierpoint College and at Jesus College, Cambridge. Sir Graham served in the Diplomatic Service between 1968 and 2003, during which time he held the following offices:

 Consul-General to Sweden—1987 and 1990
 Ambassador and Consul-General to Qatar—1990 – 1993
 Ambassador to Kuwait—1996 – 1999
 Ambassador to Egypt—1999  – 2001

Boyce was invested as a Companion of the Order of St. Michael and St. George (CMG) in 1991, and as a Knight Commander of the Order of St. Michael and St. George (KCMG) in 2001.

Boyce married Janet Elizabeth Spencer on 11 April 1970. They have four children: James (b. 1971), Rachel (b. 1974), Sara (b. 1980), and Josephine (b. 1984). His grandchildren are Sienna, Amélie, Charlie, Joey, Iona, Alana, Lauren, Rufus, Wren, and Leo.

Since leaving the Foreign and Commonwealth Office Boyce has worked for a number of companies in an advisory capacity including serving on the advisory board of Lehman Brothers Middle East, Merchant International Group and Invensys. He is currently an advisor to Nomura, DLA Piper, and Air Products and Chemicals. He has also been a consultant to UK-based arms company BAE Systems, and deputy chairman of UK-based arms company Vosper Thorneycroft.

References

Sources

1945 births
Alumni of Jesus College, Cambridge
Ambassadors of the United Kingdom to Kuwait
Ambassadors of the United Kingdom to Qatar
Ambassadors of the United Kingdom to Egypt
Knights Commander of the Order of St Michael and St George
Living people
People educated at Hurstpierpoint College